Twenty-two ships of the French Navy have borne the name Victoire ("Victory"):

Ships named Victoire 
 , a 34-gun ship of the line.
 , a 30-gun ship of the line.
 , a galley.
 , a 28-gun ship of the line, bore the name Victoire early in her career.
 , a galley.
 , a galley.
 , Fière, a galley, bore the name Victoire during her career.
 , a galley.
 , a 26-gun frigate.
 , a 40-gun frigate.
 , a 74-gun ship of the line.
 , a 80-gun ship of the line, bore the name Victoire late in her career.
 , a fluyt.
 , the captured Venetian ship Vittoria.
 , a gunboat, that the British captured on 8 March 1801 on the Nile
 , a captured Papal galley.
 , an aviso.
 , a 46-gun frigate, bore the name Victoire during her career.
 , a fluyt .
 , a sail and steam frigate.
 , a tugboat.
 , a tugboat.

Ships with similar names 
 French ship Victor
 French ship Victorieux
 French ship Victorieuse
 Victory (1813), ship in French service under Ensign Durbec, captured by the British at Cassis on 18 August 1813.
 Chasseur, a 4-gun ship, bore the name Victoire du grand Cincinnatus during her career.
 , a tugboat.

See also 
 List of ships named HMS Victory

Citations and references
References

References
 
 

French Navy ship names